Torna may refer to: 

 Torna (Irish poet) (5th century)
 Torna (moth), a synonym of Compsoctena
 Torna County, county of the former Kingdom of Hungary 
 Torna Fort in Pune District, Maharashtra, India
 Torna Hundred, administrative division of Skåne, Sweden
 Torna Ó Maolconaire (died 1468), Irish poet and historian
 Torna or torana, a free-standing ornamental or arched gateway in South and East Asia

See also
 Turna (disambiguation)